Ardizzone is an Italian surname. Notable people with the surname include:

Edward Ardizzone (1900–1979), English artist, writer and illustrator
Francesco Ardizzone (born 1992), Italian footballer
Joseph Ardizzone (1884–1931), American mob boss
Simon Ardizzone, American documentary film director and producer
Tony Ardizzone (born 1949), American writer
Tony Ardizzone (American football), properly Anthony Allen Ardizzone (born 1956), former American football player 

Italian-language surnames